Basni Belima (also known as simply Basni) is a census town in Nagaur district  in the state of Rajasthan, India.

Demographics
 India census, Basni Belima had a population of 43,786. Males constitute 50% of the population and females 50%. Basni Belima has an average literacy rate of 63%,  the national average of 74.75%; with 63% of the males and 37% of females literate. 35% of the population is under 18 years of age.

The majority of the residents in the town follow Islam which is 96.01% against the total population and the second largest majority is Hinduism which is 3.82%.

References

Cities and towns in Nagaur district